Vamps is the debut album by  Vamps, released on June 10, 2009. The limited edition includes a DVD with the music videos for the album's three singles: "Love Addict", "I Gotta Kick Start Now", and "Evanescent", as well as the video for "Trouble" (the B-side of "I Gotta Kick Start Now"), which features Anza.

The album reached number on 3 the Oricon Albums Chart, was certified Gold by the RIAJ for sales over 100,000, and received generally positive reviews. Time magazine praised the album's "chugging three-chord rock", and said "all the hallmarks of classic Japanese rock are here, but amped up and hardened for a more streetwise generation."

Track listing 

Disc two (DVD, limited edition only)

References

External links 
https://www.discogs.com/artist/299876-Josh-Wilbur

2009 debut albums
Vamps (band) albums